Bell-Varner House is a historic home located at Leitersburg, Washington County, Maryland, United States. It is a -story, five-bay brick dwelling with a two-story, four-bay rear wing, built in 1851  It features a partially enclosed double porch and slate roof.

It was listed on the National Register of Historic Places in 1979.

References

External links
, including photo in 1974, at Maryland Historical Trust

Houses on the National Register of Historic Places in Maryland
Houses in Washington County, Maryland
Houses completed in 1851
1851 establishments in Maryland
National Register of Historic Places in Washington County, Maryland